Scincella caudaequinae, commonly known as the Horsetail Falls ground skink is endemic to Mexico. It was named for the type locality "Horsetail Falls, 25 miles south of Monterrey, Nuevo, Leon". Scincella caudaequinae occurs in the northern Sierra Madre Oriental in Nuevo Leon, San Luis Potosi, southeast Coahuila, and Tamaulipas. It was considered a subspecies of Scincella silvicola for many decades.

References

Scincella
Endemic reptiles of Mexico
Fauna of the Sierra Madre Oriental
Reptiles described in 1951
Taxa named by Hobart Muir Smith